Robert Drury may refer to:

Politicians
Robert Drury (speaker) (died 1536), Speaker of the House of Commons
Robert Drury (died 1557), MP for Thetford
Robert Drury (1525-93), in 1558 Member of Parliament (MP) for Buckingham and Chipping Wycombe
Sir Robert Drury (17th century MP) (1575–1616), MP for Suffolk and Eye
Robert Drury (died 1577) (c. 1503–1577), English MP

Others
Robert Drury (priest) (1567–1607), English Roman Catholic priest, executed for treason
Robert Drury (Jesuit) (1587–1623), English Jesuit
Robert Drury (sailor) (1687–?), English sailor on the Degrave who was shipwrecked at the age of 17 on the island of Madagascar
Robert Drury (baseball) (1878–1933), minor league baseball player and manager
Sir Robert Drury, 3rd Baronet of the Drury baronets